Port Augusta is a city in South Australia.

Port Augusta may also refer to places associated with the city.

Port Augusta, South Australia, a locality 
Port Augusta Airport 
Port Augusta Prison 
Port Augusta railway station 
Port Augusta Town Hall, former town hall  
City of Port Augusta, a local government area

See also
Augusta (disambiguation)
Port Augusta West, South Australia